The Saint of Lost Causes is the eighth and final studio album released by American singer-songwriter Justin Townes Earle, and the last released before his death in 2020. It was released by New West Records on May 24, 2019.

Reception
 Jason Heller of NPR's First Listen praised the album for its stark take on contemporary American society as well as its ambiguity. At AllMusic, Mark Deming also emphasized the lyrics and their perspective, summing up that this release, "coalesce[s] into a larger story of malaise that's powerful without turning histrionic, and this is powerful music that's both timely and timeless". In Rolling Stone, Jonathan Bernstein gave the album 3.5 out of five stars, calling this, "a refreshing reminder of what the songwriter has always done best", particularly for Earle's lyrics on familial relations. Libby Cudmore's review in Paste emphasized the environmentalist and spiritual themes in the lyrics, giving the album 8.2 out of 10. Chris Ingalls of PopMatters sees the work as a critique of the American dream and gave it eight out of 10 stars.

Track listing
All songs written by Justin Townes Earle
"The Saint of Lost Causes" – 4:51
"Ain’t Got No Money" – 3:05
"Mornings in Memphis" – 4:32
"Don’t Drink the Water" – 4:41
"Frightened by the Sound" – 3:45
"Flint City Shake It" – 3:44
"Over Alameda" – 4:09
"Pacific Northwestern Blues" – 3:37
"Appalachian Nightmare" – 5:37
"Say Baby" – 4:30
"" – 4:06
"Talking to Myself" – 2:55

Personnel
Justin Townes Earle – vocals, acoustic guitar, production
Adam Ayan – mastering at Gateway Mastering, Portland, Maine, United States
Adam Bednarik – electric upright bass, bass guitar, engineering, and production
Tchad Blake – mixing at Full Mongrel Studios, Wales, United Kingdom
Fetzer Design – design
Joe V. McMahan – acoustic, baritone, electric, and slide guitar, celesta
Paul Niehaus – acoustic, electric, and pedal steel guitar
Jon Radford – drums, percussion
Zaq Reynolds – engineering
Joshua Black Wilkins – photography
Cory Younts – harmonica, piano, backing vocals

Charts

See also
List of 2019 albums

References

External links
Stream the album from Bandcamp

2019 albums
Justin Townes Earle albums
New West Records albums